Sergey Mikhaylovich Kriyanin; born February 9, 1971) is a Russian cross-country skier who competed between 1990 and 2006. He won a bronze medal in the 50 km event at the 2001 FIS Nordic World Ski Championships in Lahti.

Kriyanin's best finish at the Winter Olympics was an eighth in the 30 km freestyle mass start in 2002. He also won two 50 km events in his career in Russia in 1999 and 2001.

Cross-country skiing results
All results are sourced from the International Ski Federation (FIS).

Olympic Games

World Championships
 1 medal – (1 bronze)

World Cup

Season standings

References

External links 

Official website 

Russian male cross-country skiers
Olympic cross-country skiers of Russia
Cross-country skiers at the 1998 Winter Olympics
Cross-country skiers at the 2002 Winter Olympics
1971 births
Living people
FIS Nordic World Ski Championships medalists in cross-country skiing